Alex Usman Kadiri  (born 21 June 1942) is a Nigerian senator representing Kogi East senatorial district in Kogi State. He was elected in 1999

Education 
Kadiri obtained a PhD degree from the University of Leeds, England.

References

Living people
Members of the Senate (Nigeria) from Kogi State
1942 births